The United States District Court for the Western District of Tennessee (in case citations, W.D. Tenn.) is the federal district court covering the western part of the state of Tennessee. Appeals from the Western District of Tennessee are taken to the United States Court of Appeals for the Sixth Circuit (except for patent claims and claims against the U.S. government under the Tucker Act, which are appealed to the Federal Circuit).

Jurisdiction 
The jurisdiction of the Western District of Tennessee comprises the following counties: Benton, Carroll, Chester, Crockett, Decatur, Dyer, Fayette, Gibson, Hardeman, Hardin, Haywood, Henderson, Henry, Lake, Lauderdale, Madison, McNairy, Obion, Perry, Shelby, Tipton, and Weakley.

The court's jurisdiction includes the entirety of West Tennessee, plus Perry County in Middle Tennessee. This area includes the cities of Jackson and Memphis.

The United States Attorney's Office for the Western District of Tennessee represents the United States in civil and criminal litigation in the court.  the United States Attorney is Kevin G. Ritz.

History 
The judgeship was filled by President George Washington's appointment of John McNairy. Since Congress failed to assign the district to a circuit, the court had the jurisdiction of both a district court and a circuit court. Appeals from this one district court went directly to the United States Supreme Court.

On February 13, 1801, in the famous "Midnight Judges" Act of 1801, Congress abolished the U.S. district court in Tennessee, and expanded the number of circuits to six, provided for independent circuit court judgeships, and abolished the necessity of Supreme Court Justices riding the circuits. It was this legislation which created the grandfather of the present Sixth Circuit. The act provided for a "Sixth Circuit" comprising two districts in the State of Tennessee, one district in the State of Kentucky and one district, called the Ohio District, composed of the Ohio and Indiana territories (the latter including the present State of Michigan). The new Sixth Circuit Court was to be held at "Bairdstown" in the District of Kentucky, at Knoxville in the District of East Tennessee, at Nashville in the District of West Tennessee, and at Cincinnati in the District of Ohio. Unlike the other circuits which were provided with three circuit judges, the Sixth Circuit was to have only one circuit judge with district judges from Kentucky and Tennessee comprising the rest of the court. Any two judges constituted a quorum. New circuit judgeships were to be created as district judgeships in Kentucky and Tennessee became vacant.

The repeal of this Act restored the District on March 8, 1802, . The District was divided into the Eastern and Western Districts on April 29, 1802. On February 24, 1807, Congress again abolished the two districts and created the United States Circuit for the District of Tennessee. On March 3, 1837, Congress assigned the judicial district of Tennessee to the Eighth Circuit. Again, only one judgeship was allotted for all three districts. On July 15, 1862, Congress reassigned appellate jurisdiction to the Sixth Circuit. Finally, on June 14, 1878, Congress authorized a separate judgeship for the Western District of Tennessee. President Rutherford B. Hayes then appointed Eli Shelby Hammond as the first judge for only the Western District of Tennessee.

There are now five permanent judgeships and four magistrate judgeships for the Western District of Tennessee.

Current judges 
:

Vacancies and pending nominations

Former judges

Chief judges

Succession of seats

Courthouses 
The U.S. District Court for the Western District of Tennessee is based out of two courthouses, the Clifford Davis Federal Building on 167 North Main Street in downtown Memphis and the Ed Jones Federal Building in Jackson, Tennessee.

List of U.S. Attorneys 
 Thomas Stuart 1803–1810
 John E. Beck 1810–1818
 Henry Crabb 1818–1827
 Thomas H. Fletcher 1827–1829
 James Collinsworth 1829–1835
 William T. Brown 1835–1836
 James P. Grundy 1836–1838
 Joseph H. Talbot 1838-1838
 Henry W. McCorry 1838–1850
 Charles N. Gibbs 1850–1853
 Richard J. Hays 1853–1856
 Alexander W. McCampbell 1856–1861
 John M. McCarmack 1861–1877
 W.W. Murray 1877–1882
 William F. Poston 1882–1885
 Henry W. McCorry 1885–1889
 Samuel W. Hawkins 1889–1894
 Julius A. Taylor 1894–1895
 Charles B. Simonton 1895–1898
 George Randolph 1898–1910
 Casey Todd 1910–1914
 Hubert F. Fisher 1914–1917
 William D. Kyser 1917–1921
 S.E. Murray 1921–1926
 Tilmon A. Lancaster 1926–1926
 Nugent Dodds 1926–1926
 Lindsay B. Phillips 1926–1931
 Nelson H. Carver 1931–1932
 Dwayne D. Maddox 1932–1933
 William McClanahan 1933–1948
 John Brown 1948–1953
 Milsaps Fitzhugh 1953–1960
 Warner Hodges 1960–1961
 Thomas L. Robinson 1961–1969
 Thomas F. Turley, Jr. 1969–1977
 W.J. Michael Cody 1977–1981
 Hickman Ewing 1981–1991
 Ed Bryant 1991–1993
 Daniel A. Clancy 1993
 Veronica F. Coleman 1993–2001
 Lawrence J. Laurenzi 2001-2001
 Terrell L. Harris 2001–2005
 Lawrence J. Laurenzi 2005–2006
 David Kustoff 2006–2008
 Lawrence J. Laurenzi 2008–2010
 Edward L. Stanton III 2010–2017
 Lawrence J. Laurenzi 2017
 D. Michael Dunavant 2017–2021

See also 
 Courts of Tennessee
 List of current United States district judges
 List of United States federal courthouses in Tennessee

References

External links 
 United States District Court for the Western District of Tennessee official website
 United States Attorney for the Western District of Tennessee official website

Tennessee, Western District
Tennessee law
Jackson, Tennessee
Memphis, Tennessee
Courthouses in Tennessee
1801 establishments in the United States
1802 disestablishments in the United States
1802 establishments in the United States
1807 disestablishments in the United States
1839 establishments in the United States
Courts and tribunals established in 1801
Courts and tribunals disestablished in 1802
Courts and tribunals established in 1802
Courts and tribunals disestablished in 1807
Courts and tribunals established in 1839